Harold Crooks is a Canadian-American filmmaker.  He began his career as an investigative journalist covering environmental issues in Canada during the 1980s and 90s. His films cover the subjects of political economy and the impact humans have on their environment through technology and capitalism.  Most recently he co-directed a documentary with the art writer Judd Tully about the artist David Hammons.

Works 
 Dirty Business: the Inside Story of the New Garbage Agglomerates, J. Lorimer, 1983
 Giants of garbage: the Rise of the Global Waste Industry and the Politics of Pollution Control, James Lorimer & Company, 1993

Filmography 
 The Champagne Safari, 1995
 The Corporation, 2003
 Surviving Progress, 2013
 The Price We Pay, 2014
 The Melt Goes On Forever: The Art and Times of David Hammons, 2022

External links 
 
 The Price We Pay La Face cachée de l’impôt, Toronto International Film Festival

References 

Canadian male journalists
Canadian male non-fiction writers
Canadian documentary film directors
Living people
Year of birth missing (living people)